The Verona Band of Alameda County is the name the Muwekma Ohlone operated under while they had federal recognition in the early twentieth century.

History
The ancestors of the Verona Band were the various Ohlone peoples from what is now Contra Costa County and Alameda counties in California. Starting in the 1790s they became part of the San Jose Mission in modern Fremont, California.

After the missions were secularized in 1835 they continued to live in the area. Many of them lived in Sunol, California and neighboring Pleasanton, California.  Some of them were displaced by George Hearst's building of his mansion at Sunol. This was known as the Verona Mansion and gave this group its name.

In 1906 it was discovered that there were 18 unratified treaties related to Indigenous peoples of California. It was decided to try to provide recognition to these groups. The Verona Band of Alameda County was one of these groups and in 1906 Congress passed a bill to provide money to purchase land for the use of this band.

The money appropriated was not enough to purchase a suitable tract of land. Lafayette A. Dorrington the Indian commissioner for the Sacramento Indian Agency in 1928 decided instead of sending Congress a list of the Verona Band and 133 other California Bands that had not yet received land grants, that he would just drop their 134 groups from being federally recognized.

Today
Today the group is seeking recognition as the Muwekma Ohlone Tribe.

References

Ohlone
1906 establishments in California
Native American tribes in California
Alameda County, California
Unrecognized tribes in the United States